Annona dolichophylla is a species of plant in the Annonaceae family. It is endemic to Peru.

References

Trees of Peru
dolichophylla
Vulnerable plants
Taxonomy articles created by Polbot